Barnabás Tóth (born 28 July 1994) is a Hungarian professional footballer who plays for Dorogi FC.

Club statistics

Updated to games played as of 1 September 2019.

References

1994 births
Living people
Footballers from Budapest
Hungarian footballers
Association football forwards
Puskás Akadémia FC players
Vác FC players
Diósgyőri VTK players
Tiszakécske FC footballers
Dorogi FC footballers
Nemzeti Bajnokság I players
Nemzeti Bajnokság II players